John Heaviside may refer to:
 John Heaviside (footballer)
 John Heaviside (surgeon)